Hyundai AutoEver is an automobile sales internet company. It is part of Hyundai Motor Group.

It was established in 2000, with headquarters are in Seoul, South Korea.  

Hyundai AutoEver is owned by the Hyundai Motor Company and Kia Motors to sell new cars on portal websites.

On-Line sales networking
Hyundai Motor Company
Kia Motors

See also
Hyundai Kia Automotive Group
Hyundai Motor Company
Kia Motors

External links
 

Auto dealerships
Hyundai Motor Group
Kia Motors
Hyundai Motor Company
Internet properties established in 2000
Retail companies established in 2000
South Korean companies established in 2000